Martin Kovachev (born 13 March 1982) is a Bulgarian footballer, currently playing  as a defender for Makedonija.

Career
Kovachev played for Velbazhd Kyustendil, Spartak Varna, Litex Lovech and Dunav Rousse before moving to Chernomorets in June 2008 for a free transfer. With the club Kovachev played in a matches of Intertoto Cup 2008 against Slovenian ND Gorica and Swiss Grasshopper Club Zürich. Six months later he is loaned to Naftex Burgas. On 5 July 2009 Kovachev signed three years contract with OFC Sliven 2000.

On December 29, 2014, he signed with Pusamania Borneo FC.

Honours
Pelister
Macedonian Cup: 2016–17

References

External links
 

1982 births
Living people
Bulgarian footballers
Bulgarian expatriate footballers
First Professional Football League (Bulgaria) players
PFC Litex Lovech players
PFC Spartak Varna players
FC Dunav Ruse players
PFC Chernomorets Burgas players
Neftochimic Burgas players
OFC Sliven 2000 players
FC Botev Vratsa players
FC Montana players
FK Pelister players
FC Haskovo players
FK Makedonija Gjorče Petrov players
Borneo F.C. players
Kazakhstan Premier League players
Macedonian First Football League players
Liga 1 (Indonesia) players
Expatriate footballers in Indonesia
Expatriate footballers in Kazakhstan
Expatriate footballers in North Macedonia
Association football defenders
Bulgarian expatriate sportspeople in North Macedonia
People from Kyustendil
Sportspeople from Kyustendil Province